Thiel is a lunar impact crater on the far side of the Moon. It is located to the south of the larger crater Quetelet, and to the north-northwest of Charlier. This is a sharp-edged, roughly circular crater with a small impact along the outer rim to the north-northeast. It is otherwise relatively free from impact erosion, and the interior is unmarked by significant craters. The inner walls are uneven in places, with piles of scree along the base.

Satellite craters
By convention these features are identified on lunar maps by placing the letter on the side of the crater midpoint that is closest to Thiel.

References

 
 
 
 
 
 
 
 
 
 
 
 

Impact craters on the Moon